NYE In The Park is an annual music festival that is held in Victoria Park, Sydney, Australia. The first festival was held on 31 December 2017.

Artist lineups by year

2017

2ManyDJs (DJ Set)
Furnace & The Fundamentals
Haiku Hands
Hot Dub Time Machine
Krafty Kuts & Chali 2NA
Luen Jacobs
Maribelle
Mezko
Nicole Millar
Northeast Party House
Paces (musician)
Parcels (band)
Purple Sneakers DJs
Running Touch
Total Giovanni
Tiga (musician)
Vera Blue
Yahtzel
Plus hosts: Retrosweat

2018

The Presets
The Jungle Giants
Hayden James
Hot Dub Time Machine
Thundamentals
Confidence Man (band)
Luke Million
One Day DJ's 
Thandi Phoenix
The Meeting Tree
Fleetmac Wood
Cxloe
Kinder
SOSUEME DJ's
Sideboob
Tasker (producer)

2019

Hermitude
Girl Talk (musician) (USA) – exclusive
Crooked Colours
Safia
Client Liaison
Bag Raiders
Sneaky Sound System
Touch Sensitive
Young Franco
Graace
Owl Eyes
Alice Ivy
Chase Zera
Jawbreakers
Happiness Is Health
All My Friends DJs
Van She Tech

2021
PNAU
Illy
Spacey Jane
The Presets
What So Not
Chase Zera
Dena Amy
George Alice
Jim the Kween
Kinder
Mashd N Kutcher
Poof Doof Drag Jamboree
Sumner (band)
Thandi Phoenix
Yo! Mafia

References

External links
 

Rock festivals in Australia
Recurring events established in 2017
Summer festivals